Matthieu Pichot (born 20 September 1989) is a French professional footballer who currently plays for Championnat National 2 side Andrézieux-Bouthéon as a goalkeeper.

He was the goalkeeper for Les Herbiers in the 2018 Coupe de France Final.

References

External links
 Mathieu Pichot at footballdatabase.eu
 Mathieu Pichot at foot-national.com

1989 births
Living people
People from Sablé-sur-Sarthe
French footballers
Association football goalkeepers
Stade Lavallois players
Les Herbiers VF players
Vendée Poiré-sur-Vie Football players
CA Bastia players
Football Bourg-en-Bresse Péronnas 01 players
Andrézieux-Bouthéon FC players
Ligue 2 players
Championnat National players
Championnat National 2 players
Championnat National 3 players
Sportspeople from Sarthe
Footballers from Pays de la Loire